Saphenista nomonana is a species of moth of the  family Tortricidae. It is found in California, United States.

Adults are on wing in April and May.

References

Moths described in 1907
Saphenista